Thanh Bình is a ward (phường) of Điện Biên Phủ in Điện Biên Province in northwestern Vietnam.

Communes of Điện Biên province
Geography of Điện Biên province
Dien Bien Phu